Fordyce Fork is a stream in the U.S. state of Missouri. It is a tributary to Rodes Creek.

Fordyce Fork is named after Samuel W. Fordyce (1840-1919), a railroad official.

References

Rivers of Missouri
Rivers of St. Louis County, Missouri